Team Australia represents Australia in women's international roller derby, under the WFTDA rule set, in play such as at the Roller Derby World Cup. The team was first formed to compete at the 2011 World Cup in Toronto, and finished the tournament in fourth place, beating Team Sweden by 126 points 80 in their quarterfinal, but losing to Team USA 532 to 4 in the semifinal, and to Team England 203 to 85 in the third-place playoff.  Before the event, coach Thigh-dal Wave stated that the team aimed to play against the United States and to beat Team New Zealand.

Team Australia finished in third place at the 2014 Roller Derby World Cup in Dallas, and competed in the 2018 World Cup in Manchester, where they were defeated in the finals by USA Roller Derby.

Team roster

2017-18 team roster
Current team roster - formed in 2017 for the 2018 Roller Derby World Cup.

2014 team roster
In December 2013, Team Australia announced their 2014 roster.
(skaters' league affiliations as of the time of the announcement)

2011 team roster

Team Australia announced their first roster of twenty skaters in September 2011, which played at the 2011 Roller Derby World Cup.
(skaters' league affiliations as of the time of the announcement)

Junior Team Australia

2015 Junior World Cup
In April 2015 the Inaugural Junior Team Australia squad  was announced to represent Australia at the first ever Junior Roller Derby World Cup in Kent, Washington during July 2015. The junior squad is open to females and males.

Details were correct at time of tournament.

2018 Junior World Cup
The following squad represented Australia at the second Junior Roller Derby World Cup in Feasterville-Trevose, Pennsylvania during July 2018.

Details were correct at time of tournament.

References

Australia
Roller derby
Roller derby in Australia
2011 establishments in Australia
Sports clubs established in 2011